Košarkaški klub Radnik, currently known as Radnik Elvaco MetPro due to sponsorship reasons, is a men's professional basketball club based in Bijeljina, Republika Srpska, Bosnia and Herzegovina. They are currently competing in the First League of R Srpska.

History
The club is formed on 20 May 1961 as OKK Bijeljina and renamed as KK Radnik later.

Sponsorship naming
The club has had several denominations through the years due to its sponsorship:
 Radnik BNB (2014–2019)
 Radnik Elvaco MetPro (2019–present)

Players

Head coaches 

  Ružda Trhulj (1962–N/A)
  Zoran Andrić (2006–2007)
  Igor Mihajlović (2008–2011)
  Predrag Jaćimović (2011–2013)
  Bogdan Stanojević (2013–2014)
  Igor Mihajlović (2014–2015)
  Branislav Vićentić (2015–2018)
  Vladimir Radovanović (2018–present)

Trophies and awards
First League of Republika Srpska (2nd-tier)
Winners  (4): 2003–04, 2011–12, 2014–15, 2016–17

Notable former players
 Nihad Izić
 Slobodan Popović
 Dragiša Šarić

References

External links
 
  at eurobasket.com

Radnik
Radnik
Radnik
Radnik
Radnik
Sport in Republika Srpska